Metopius was a churchman in Galicia, Spain, in the 7th century. He served as bishop of Britonia, and represented his see at the Fourth Council of Toledo in 633. The diocese of Britonia had been established for the Celtic Britons who had settled in the region en masse during the previous century, and Metopius' attendance of the Council of Toledo demonstrates its survival in the 7th century.

External links
  Official web site of the Diocese of Mondoñedo-Ferrol

7th-century Galician bishops